Tyler Independent School District is an independent school district based in Tyler, Texas (USA).

In addition to serving most of Tyler, the district serves the city of Noonday and rural areas in west central Smith County. Notable alumni include Earl Campbell (Tyler High) and Sandy Duncan (Tyler Legacy High).

In 2019, the school district was rated as a "B" by the Texas Education Agency.

History

Like other Texas school districts, Tyler ISD formerly separated children into different schools on the basis of race. The district established a plan to racially integrate; the board of trustees approved such a plan in 1965.

Demographics

Leadership

School Board 

The District is run by a seven-member school board of trustees who are elected in single member districts to three-year terms each May.

Former Trustees include: Rev. Fritz Hager Jr, Rev. Orenthia Mason, Freeman Sterling, Jean Washington and Therelee Washington.

Schools

High Schools (Grades 9-12)
 Tyler Legacy High School (1958)
 Tyler High School (1912)
 Early College High School
 RISE Academy

Middle Schools (Grades 6-8)
 Boulter Middle School (1959)
 Hubbard Middle School (1964)
 Moore MST Magnet School (1955)
 Three Lakes Middle School (2015)

Elementary Schools (Grades PK-5)
 Austin Elementary
 Bell Elementary
 Bonner Elementary
 Clarkston Elementary
 Dixie Elementary
 Douglas Elementary
 Griffin Elementary
 Jack Elementary
 Jones Elementary
 Orr Elementary
 Owens Elementary
 Peete Elementary
 Ramey Elementary
 Rice Elementary
 Woods Elementary

Innovation Schools (Grades PK-8)
 Caldwell Arts Academy
 Birdwell Dual Language Immersion School

Auxiliary Facilities

Tyler ISD also maintains the Professional Development Complex (located adjacent to Peete Elementary in Tyler). This facility houses a small number of information technology staff and serves as a large training facility for Tyler ISD faculty and staff. It is located in the building which served as the former campus of Peete Elementary (commonly called, "The Old Peete Campus").
Gary Elementary also serves as the district's site for elementary gifted and talented education (referred to as the TARGET program)

School Photographs

See also

 Plyler v. Doe

References

External links

 John Tyler Football site
 Robert E. Lee Football site

School districts in Smith County, Texas
Education in Tyler, Texas